Utricularia ochroleuca, the yellowishwhite bladderwort, pale bladderwort, or cream-flowered bladderwort, is a small, perennial carnivorous plant that belongs to the genus Utricularia. It is usually found affixed to the substrate. U. ochroleuca is a circumboreal species and is found in North America, Asia, and Europe.

See also 
 List of Utricularia species

References 

Carnivorous plants of Asia
Carnivorous plants of Europe
Carnivorous plants of North America
ochroleuca